Niccolo Tagle (born 1 March 1997) is a New Zealand badminton player. He was the 2015 Oceania Junior Champion in the boys' doubles event partnered with Daxxon Vong. In 2017, he won the silver medals at the Oceania Championships in the men's singles and doubles event.

Achievements

Oceania Championships 
Men's singles

Men's doubles

Mixed doubles

Oceania Junior Championships 
Boys' doubles

References

External links 
 

Living people
1997 births
New Zealand male badminton players